Michael "Michel" Cliff Tuffery  (born 27 May 1966) is a New Zealand artist of Samoan, Tahitian and Cook Islands descent. He is one of New Zealand's most well known artists and his work is held in many art collections in New Zealand and around the world.

Early life 
His mother is Samoan Bula Tuffery (nee Paotonu) and his biological father was Cook Island Tahitian. His step father was Denis Tuffery, of European descent.

He attended Newlands College in Wellington, and has a Diploma in Fine Arts (Hons) from the School of Fine Arts at Otago Polytechnic (1989). 

He lives and works in Wellington.

Career 
One of his distinctive sculptures from 1994 is the life-sized work, entitled Pisupo Lua Afe (Corned Beef 2000), which was constructed from flattened and riveted re-cycled corned beef tins. His work is shaped by his research into, and encounters with his Polynesian heritage  while making use of Māori design. Many of his works explore colonialism and people's treatment of the environment. Renowned as a printmaker, painter and sculptor, Tuffery has gained national and international recognition, and has made a major contribution to New Zealand art.

Awards 
He was appointed a Member of the New Zealand Order of Merit, for services to art, in the 2008 Queen's Birthday Honours. In 2010 he was awarded the Contemporary Pacific Art Award at the Creative New Zealand Arts Pasifka Awards, while in 2020 he received the Senior Pacific Artist Award from the same organisation.

List of works and exhibitions

Tuffery has exhibited extensively in New Zealand and internationally.

 1989 Tautai Artists, Gallery 33 1/3 and Louise Beale Gallery, Wellington
1990 Te Moemoea no Iotefa, Sarjeant Art Gallery, Whanganui
 1990 Three Polynesian Artists, Robert McDougall Art Gallery, Christchurch
 1990 Anti Drift Net Series, ASA Gallery, Auckland
 1994 Bottled Ocean City Gallery Wellington and touring 
 1994 Woodcuts on Tapa, Claybrook Gallery, Auckland
 1994 Pisupo Lua Afe, Wellington
 1994 Povi Tau Vaga - The Challenge, Wellington
 1996 7th Festival of Pacific Arts group exhibition, Samoa
 1997 Pacific Diaries, Hogarth Gallery, Sydney
 1997 Common Ground, Page 90 Art Gallery, Taranaki
 1998 Recent Works, Portfolio Gallery, Auckland
 1998 Paringa Ou, Fiji Museum, Fiji
 1998 Testing Traditions, Aotea Centre, Auckland
 1999 O le Vasa Loloto ma le Laloa, Christchurch
 1999 Povi Lua Noumea, and Faga Ofe E'a, in collaboration with artist Patrice Kaikilekofe, New Caledonia
 2001 Asiasi, Jane Land Gallery, Wellington
 2001 Out of the Blue, Hawkes Bay Exhibitions Centre, Hastings
 2002 Mata Mata, Toi o Tamaki, Auckland City Art Gallery
 2002 Diaspora - Art of the Asia Pacific, Portfolio Gallery, Auckland
 2002 Pasifika, The Lane Gallery, Auckland
 2003 Voyages, The Lane Gallery, Auckland
 2003 Animated Effigy, MacKay Art Gallery, North Queensland
 2012 First Contact, multi-media work for the opening of the 2012 New Zealand International Arts Festival
 2012 Siamani Samoa, Pataka Museum and Gallery, Porirua
 2012 50 Years of Friendship: New Zealand & Samoa, commemorative NZ coin design issued by the Reserve Bank of New Zealand.
 2013 Made in Oceania: Tapa – Art and Social Landscapes, Rautenstrauch-Joest Museum, Germany
 2015 World War I Remembered: A Light and Sound Show, multi-media installation with Ngataiharuru Taepa, Pukeahu National War Memorial Park, Wellington

References

External links
Artist's website
Works from the collection of the Museum of New Zealand Te Papa Tongarewa
Interview with Michael Tuffery about his project commemorating the anniversary of World War One Standing Room Only, Radio New Zealand National, 2015

New Zealand painters
New Zealand people of Cook Island descent
New Zealand people of French Polynesian descent
New Zealand people of Samoan descent
Members of the New Zealand Order of Merit
Living people
Otago Polytechnic alumni
20th-century New Zealand sculptors
20th-century New Zealand male artists
21st-century New Zealand sculptors
21st-century New Zealand male artists
1966 births